Martin Gélinas (born June 5, 1970) is a Canadian former professional ice hockey forward who played 1,273 games in the National Hockey League (NHL) for the Edmonton Oilers, Quebec Nordiques, Vancouver Canucks, Carolina Hurricanes, Calgary Flames, Florida Panthers and Nashville Predators.  A first round selection of the Los Angeles Kings at the 1988 NHL Entry Draft, Gélinas was sent to the Oilers as part of the 1988 Wayne Gretzky trade before ever playing a game for the Kings.

Gélinas reached the Stanley Cup finals with four teams. He was a member of Edmonton's 1990 championship team and also reached the final in 1994 with Vancouver, 2002 with Carolina and 2004 with Calgary. He tied a record in 2004 by scoring three series-winning goals in one playoff year, earning the nickname "The Eliminator".  After playing his final professional season with SC Bern in the Swiss National League A (NLA), Gélinas turned to coaching and player development.  He was named an assistant coach with the Calgary Flames in 2012.

Playing career

Junior
Gélinas played two seasons of junior hockey in the Quebec Major Junior Hockey League (QMJHL) for the Hull Olympiques between 1987 and 1989.  He scored 101 goals and 107 assists in 106 games. In his first year, 1987–88, Gélinas finished 10th in QMJHL scoring with 131 points. He won the Michel Bergeron Trophy as offensive rookie of the year and was named Canadian Hockey League rookie of the year in addition to being named a QMJHL first-team all-star. Gélinas added 32 points in 17 playoff games as the Olympiques defeated the Drummondville Voltigeurs in the final to win the President's Cup.  At the 1988 Memorial Cup, Gélinas won the George Parsons Trophy as the most sportsmanlike player of the tournament.

The National Hockey League (NHL) Central Scouting Bureau ranked Gélinas as the eighth best prospect at the 1988 NHL Entry Draft. He was selected by the Los Angeles Kings with the seventh overall pick. Gélinas never played for the Kings as on August 9, 1988, he was included in one of the most significant trades in NHL history. The Edmonton Oilers sent Wayne Gretzky, Mike Krushelnyski and Marty McSorley to the Kings in exchange for Gelinas, Jimmy Carson, three first round draft picks and $15 million in cash.

As one of the key players coming to Edmonton in what he later called "the biggest trade in sports history", Gélinas endured the scrutiny of the Canadian media and pressure created by angry and disappointed fans after the Oilers dealt away a player in Gretzky who was considered a national icon. Gélinas began the 1988–89 season with the Oilers and made his NHL debut and scored his first point, on an assist, on October 7, 1988, against the New York Islanders. He scored his first goal ten days later against Jon Casey of the Minnesota North Stars but he was returned to Hull after six games to complete his second season of junior hockey.  Making his international debut, Gélinas played with the Canadian national junior team at the 1989 World Junior Ice Hockey Championships.  He recorded two assists in seven games for the fourth place Canadians.

Edmonton, Vancouver and Carolina
Joining the Oilers full-time in 1989–90, Gélinas recorded 25 points in 46 games. At the age of 19, he was a member of Edmonton's "Kid Line" playing alongside 22-year-olds Joe Murphy and Adam Graves.  The trio provided an offensive boost in the post-season as the Oilers reached the 1990 Stanley Cup Final against the Boston Bruins. Edmonton won the best-of-seven championship series four games to one and captured the Stanley Cup. After recording 40 points in 1990–91, Gélinas scored only 29 points the following season. The Quebec Nordiques, who had been criticized by local fans and media for failing to select Gélinas at the 1988 draft, attempted to acquire him in exchange for Bryan Fogarty. The deal failed to materialize and Gélinas remained with the Oilers for the 1992–93 season where his offensive production again declined, to 23 points.

The Nordiques finally acquired Gélinas on June 20, 1993, in exchange for Scott Pearson. He lasted only 31 games with Quebec before being placed on waivers and claimed by the Vancouver Canucks. After scoring 16 points in 33 games to end the 1993–94 regular season with Vancouver, Gélinas added nine points in 24 playoff games. The Canucks reached the 1994 Stanley Cup Final but were defeated in seven games by the New York Rangers. In the lockout-shortened 1994–95 season, he scored 23 points in 46 games and won his first of two consecutive Fred J. Hume Awards as Vancouver's "unsung hero". Gélinas finally achieved the offensive production expected of him when he was drafted by recording consecutive 30-goal seasons. He scored 30 goals in 1995–96 and led the Canucks with 35 goals, was second to Alexander Mogilny with 68 points and recorded a four-goal game against the Phoenix Coyotes in 1996–97. He won three team awards: The Cyclone Taylor Award as Vancouver's most valuable player, the Molson Cup for earning the most three star selections and the Most Exciting Player Award.

A collision with Edmonton's Dan McGillis early in the 1997–98 season forced Gélinas out of the lineup with a sprained knee. He missed 16 games due to the injury and had only eight points in 24 games played. His tenure with the Canucks ended January 3, 1998. He was traded, along with Kirk McLean to the Carolina Hurricanes in exchange for Sean Burke, Geoff Sanderson and Enrico Ciccone. Gélinas was added to Carolina's roster to add a physical presence to the team and improve the team at both ends of the ice. He finished the season with 24 points in 40 games with the Hurricanes, and was invited to join Team Canada for the 1998 World Championship. Gélinas scored one goal for the sixth-place Canadians.

Placed in a defensive role, Gélinas's offensive statistics fell to 28 points in 1998–99 and 30 in 1999–2000. The Hurricanes placed him on waivers late in the latter season, but remained with the team after he went unclaimed. His teammates expressed relief that he hadn't been moved the following season as, after improving to 59 points, Gélinas scored the game-winning goal to clinch a playoff spot for Carolina. He recorded only one assist in six post-season games, then accepted a lessened role with the Hurricanes as he was placed on the third line in 2001–02.  Gélinas led the Hurricanes to their first Stanley Cup Final in franchise history after scoring the overtime-winning goal in the sixth game of the Eastern Conference final to eliminate the Toronto Maple Leafs. Carolina fell to the Detroit Red Wings in five games in the 2002 Stanley Cup Final.

Calgary, Florida and Nashville
Gélinas chose to decline his contract option for 2002–03 and left Carolina as a free agent. He signed a contract with the Calgary Flames on July 2, 2002. A 52-point season was fourth best on the Flames and included his 500th career point, a game-winning goal against the Detroit Red Wings on January 25, 2003. Gélinas reached another career milestone during the 2003–04 season as he played in his 1,000th NHL game on December 9 against the Minnesota Wild. His 35 points on the season was again fourth-best on the team.

In qualifying for the 2004 Stanley Cup Playoffs, the Flames reached the post-season for the first time in eight seasons. With eight goals and 15 points in the playoffs, Gélinas emerged as one of Calgary's post-season heroes. He scored the series-winning goal in overtime of game seven of the Flames' first round series against Vancouver. The victory advanced Calgary to the second round of the playoffs for the first time in 15 years. Gélinas also scored the overtime goal that eliminated Detroit in six games, which made him the first player in NHL history to score three series-winning goals in overtime. He then became the second player in NHL history to score three series-clinching goals in one playoff year by tallying the goal that eliminated the San Jose Sharks and propelled the Flames into the 2004 Stanley Cup Final. His heroics throughout the post-season resulted in Gélinas being called "the Eliminator".

The Flames' Cinderella run ended in the final as the Tampa Bay Lightning won the series in seven games. The result was controversial as Gélinas appeared to have scored the tie-breaking goal in the sixth game that would have won the Stanley Cup for Calgary had the score held up. Television replays of the play showed that the puck deflected off Gélinas' skate and appeared to be across the goal line before Tampa goaltender Nikolai Khabibulin kicked it out of the net. The referees did not signal a goal, however, and no video review was requested.  Tampa Bay went on to win the game in overtime.

As the 2004–05 NHL season went unplayed due to a labour dispute, Gélinas spent the season in Switzerland. He played one regular season and five playoff games with HC Lugano in the Nationalliga A (NLA), but otherwise spent the season with HC Forward-Morges in the Nationalliga B (NLB) where he scored 37 goals in 41 games and recorded 58 points. A free agent when the NHL resumed play in 2005–06, Gélinas signed a two-year contract with the Florida Panthers. Brought in as a capable veteran, he played all 82 games for Florida and scored over 40 points in each season. Gélinas scored his 300th career goal in Florida's final game of the 2006–07 season.

Leaving Florida, Gélinas signed with the Nashville Predators for the 2007–08 season. He had 20 points in 57 games before suffering a torn anterior cruciate ligament on February 21, 2008, game against the Vancouver Canucks that was ultimately his final contest in the NHL. Gélinas returned to Switzerland 2008–09 as he signed a contract to play with SC Bern in the NLA. In 27 games, he scored 15 goals and 22 points. He retired following the season.  In his NHL career, Gélinas played 1,273 regular season games and added 147 in the playoffs. His former junior team, now known as the Gatineau Olympiques, retired his uniform number 20 in 2012.

Coaching career
The Nashville Predators hired Gélinas as their director of player development in 2009. He had spent the final years of his playing career mentoring younger teammates, and Predators general manager David Poile praised him as being an ideal person for the role: "we will depend on Martin and his experience, work ethic and professionalism to help develop our prospects into NHL players". Spending up to 20 days per month on the road, he often served in a coaching capacity by assisting players during practices when visiting Nashville's farm club, the Milwaukee Admirals. He carried that experience back to Calgary in 2012 when he was hired as the Flames' assistant coach under Bob Hartley. One of Gélinas' duties with the team is to work with the special teams units, both the power play and the penalty kill.

Personal life
A native of Shawinigan-Sud, Quebec, Gélinas is the son of René Gélinas and Lise Lebel. His father was a barber in Shawinigan-Sud. As a youth, Gélinas played in the 1983 Quebec International Pee-Wee Hockey Tournament with the Shawinigan Cats minor ice hockey team.

Gélinas and his wife Jane have three children: son Matthew and daughters Cameron and Morgan.  The family have made Calgary their permanent home since he first signed with the Flames in 2002. Mathew is also a hockey player, and in 2013–14 is in junior as a member of the Tri-City Americans.

Active with charitable endeavours throughout his career, Gélinas was named the recipient of the Ralph T. Scurfield Humanitarian Award in 2004.  A Calgary Flames team award, it is given to the player who best combines on-ice leadership with a dedication to community service. He is involved with the Calgary Flames Alumni Association's charitable events. Gélinas is also involved with Calgary's business industry, holding an interest in Calgary-based Whitecap Resources.

Career statistics

Regular season and playoffs

International

Awards and honours

References

External links

1970 births
Living people
Calgary Flames coaches
Calgary Flames players
Canadian ice hockey left wingers
Carolina Hurricanes players
Edmonton Oilers players
Florida Panthers players
French Quebecers
HC Forward-Morges players
HC Lugano players
Hull Olympiques players
Ice hockey people from Quebec
Los Angeles Kings draft picks
Nashville Predators personnel
Nashville Predators players
National Hockey League first-round draft picks
Sportspeople from Shawinigan
Quebec Nordiques players
SC Bern players
Stanley Cup champions
Vancouver Canucks players
Canadian expatriate ice hockey players in Switzerland
Canadian ice hockey coaches